Ethmia epileuca is a moth in the family Depressariidae. It is found in the United States in southern California and Tucson, Arizona.

The ground color of the forewings is divided by a straight longitudinal line, it is brown or gray-brown above and white below. The ground color of the hindwings (including fringe and underside) is white. Adults are on wing from February to April.

References

Moths described in 1959
epileuca